Gandaria Railway Station is a railway station located in Gendaria Thana, Dhaka District, Bangladesh. The Dhaka–Jessore line starts from this station.

History 
The demand for jute was increasing all over the world. For the purpose of meeting that growing demand, there was a need for better communication system than the existing communication system to supply jute from Eastern Bengal to Port of Kolkata. Therefore in 1885 a 144 km wide meter gauge railway line named Dhaka State Railway was constructed to bring raw jute to Kolkata mainly by river which connects Mymensingh with Narayanganj. Gandaria railway station was built as part of the project during the construction of Narayanganj–Bahadurabad Ghat line.

Trains 
Narayanganj Commuter and some local trains run through Gandaria railway station.

References

External link 
 

Old Dhaka
Railway stations in Dhaka District
Railway stations opened in 1885
1885 establishments in British India